Prisad is a village in Sozopol Municipality, in Burgas Province, in southeastern Bulgaria.

Honours
Prisad Island in Antarctica is named after the village.

References

Villages in Burgas Province